Mais Gomar (born 1 July 1976) is an Iraqi TV actress.

Early life
Mais Gomar Abd Jassim was born in Baghdad, Iraq. One of her most important serials is Al hkomat(The Governments) in 2007 which presented Al Sharqiya, and resulted in her fame in Iraq.

TV serials
 Hob wa Harb (Love and War) 2004
 Al Hkomat (The Governments) 2007
 Nojjom Al dohr (The stars of the afternoon) 2008
 Akbar kadab 1 (The biggest liar part 1) 2012
 Abou Al malaien (The millions' owner) 2013

References

1976 births
Living people
Iraqi television actresses
Iraqi people of Indian descent
Iraqi comedians
20th-century Iraqi actresses
21st-century Iraqi actresses
Association footballers' wives and girlfriends